The 2012 Open Seguros Bolívar was a professional tennis tournament played on clay courts. It was the eighth edition of the tournament which was part of the 2012 ATP Challenger Tour. It took place in Bogotá, Colombia between 9 and 15 July 2012.

Singles main draw entrants

Seeds

 1 Rankings are as of June 25, 2012.

Other entrants
The following players received wildcards into the singles main draw:
  Santiago Giraldo
  Gonzalo Lama
  Feliciano López
  Michael Quintero

The following players received entry from the qualifying draw:
  Nicolás Barrientos
  Erik Crepaldi
  Christopher Díaz Figueroa
  Roberto Quiroz

Champions

Singles

 Alejandro Falla def.  Santiago Giraldo, 7–5, 6–3

Doubles

 Marcelo Demoliner /  Víctor Estrella def.  Thomas Fabbiano /  Riccardo Ghedin, 6–4, 6–2

External links
Official Website

Open Seguros Bolivar
Seguros Bolívar Open Bogotá
2012 in Colombian tennis